The FIBA Women's AmeriCup Most Valuable Player Award is a FIBA award given every two years, to the Most Outstanding player throughout the tournament.

Winners

See also
 FIBA Women's AmeriCup All-Tournament Team
 FIBA Women's Basketball World Cup Most Valuable Player
 FIBA Women's Basketball World Cup All-Tournament Team
 FIBA Awards

References

Most Valuable Player
Basketball trophies and awards